Lambulodes brunneomarginata is a moth of the family Erebidae. It was described by Walter Rothschild in 1912. It is found in New Guinea, where it has been recorded from Waigeo and on mainland New Guinea. The habitat consists of mountainous areas.

References

Lithosiina
Moths described in 1912